Hitchhiker's thumb, also known as distal hyperextensibility of the thumb is the condition of having a thumb that has a distal phalange that bends backwards in an angle of 90°, it is thought to be inherited in an autosomal recessive manner, however, it presents on genetic disorders that are inherited in an autosomal dominant manner. This condition is benign (when isolated) and does not cause pain or affect the thumb with the trait negatively.

If a person has the genes for this condition, it might present bilaterally, unilaterally, or on none of the thumbs.

Signs and symptoms 
Symptoms vary among people with hitchhiker's thumbs, those who have it as an isolated trait aren't affected by any symptoms, however, this trait is sometimes a symptom of other conditions, such as a hypermobility spectrum disorder.

The signs of this trait are having a thumb with a distal phalange that is able to bend backwards beyond the normal range of motion.
Some people with hitchhiker's thumb also have a Z-shaped deformity, named after the appearance of this deformity, which is that of the letter Z.

Causes 
The exact cause of isolated hitchhiker's thumb is not known, it is thought to be inherited in an autosomal recessive manner.

However, this trait is often a symptom of an underlying condition, such as

Diastrophic dysplasia
Hypermobility spectrum disorder
Rheumatoid arthritis

Diagnosis 
The trait does not generally need a medical diagnosis, however, it can help with the diagnosis of an individual who is suspected of having a certain condition.

Treatment 
It is not associated with any condition, and does not need treatment.

Incidence 
Hitchhiker's thumbs affect 24-36% of the U.S. population.

See also 
Hypermobility (joints)
Ligamentous laxity
Hypermobility spectrum disorder
Ehlers-Danlos syndromes
Diastrophic dysplasia
Thumb

References 

Fingers
Ailments of unknown cause